Ana María Segura Pérez (born 5 February 1969) is a former professional tennis player from Spain.

Biography
Segura reached a top singles ranking of 185 in the world, with her best WTA Tour performance a round of 16 appearance at the Swedish Open in 1990.

As a doubles player, Segura was ranked as high as 103 and featured in the main draws of the French Open, Wimbledon and US Open in 1992, all partnering Janet Souto. She and Petra Langrová were runners-up in the doubles in the 1992 edition of the Internazionali Femminili di Palermo WTA Tour tournament.

WTA Tour finals

Doubles (0–1)

ITF finals

Singles (2–4)

Doubles (8–7)

References

External links
 
 

1969 births
Living people
Spanish female tennis players
20th-century Spanish women
21st-century Spanish women